After the Music Stops is the second studio album released by Christian rap artist Lecrae on September 24, 2006. The album received a Stellar Award nomination for "Rap/Hip-Hop/Gospel CD of the Year" and a Dove Award nomination for Rap/Hip-Hop Album of the Year.

In the July–August 2010 issue of MH Magazine, After the Music Stops was second on the list of "Top Christian Hip Hop Albums of All Time".

Background
Now after extensive touring opportunities across the U.S. to large and small venues, Lecrae's goal in After the Music Stops is to urge listeners to glorify God with their lifestyle by pointing them to the person of Jesus Christ.

Track listing

Awards 

In 2007, the album was nominated for a Dove Award for Rap/Hip-Hop Album of the Year at the 38th GMA Dove Awards.

References 

2006 albums
Lecrae albums
Cross Movement Records albums
Reach Records albums
Albums produced by Lecrae